The 2013 Northeast Conference men's basketball tournament was held on March 6, 9, and 12, 2013. The tournament featured the league's top eight seeds. The tourney opened on Wednesday, March 6 with the quarterfinals, followed by the semifinals on Saturday, March 9 and the finals on Tuesday, March 12. LIU Brooklyn won the championship, its fifth, and received the conferences automatic bid to the 2013 NCAA tournament. This is LIU's third NEC tournament championship in a row, having won it the previous two years, they are the first NEC team to three-peat.

Format
For the ninth straight year, the NEC Men's Basketball Tournament will consist of an eight-team playoff format with all games played at the home of the higher seed. After the quarterfinals, the teams will be reseeded so the highest remaining seed plays the lowest remaining seed in the semifinals.

Seeds
Teams are seeded based on the final regular season standings, with ties broken under an NEC policy.

Bracket

All games were played at the venue of the higher seed

All-tournament team
Tournament MVP in bold.

Game Summaries

Quarterfinals: Robert Morris vs. St. Francis Brooklyn
Series History: RMU leads 39-26

Quarterfinals: Mount St. Mary's at Bryant
Series History:

Quarterfinals: Wagner vs. Central Connecticut
Series History:

Quarterfinals: Long Island vs Quinnipiac 
Series History:

Semifinal: Mount St. Mary's at Robert Morris
Series History: 
Announcers:

Semifinal: Long Island at Wagner
Series History: 
Announcers:

Championship: Long Island vs Mount St. Mary's
Series History: 
Announcers:

References

Northeast Conference men's basketball tournament
Tournament
Northeast Conference men's basketball tournament
Northeast Conference men's basketball tournament